Purba Medinipur (English: East Medinipur, alternative spelling Midnapore) district is an administrative unit in the Indian state of West Bengal. It is the southernmost district of Medinipur division – one of the five administrative divisions of West Bengal. The headquarters in Tamluk. It was formed on 1 January 2002 after the Partition of Medinipur into Purba Medinipur and Paschim Medinipur which lies at the northern and western border of it. The state of Odisha is at the southwest border; the Bay of Bengal lies in the south; the Hooghly river and South 24 Parganas district to the east; Howrah district to the north-east; Paschim Medinipur district to the west.

Purba Medinipur is formed of the sub-divisions of Tamluk, Contai and Haldia of erstwhile Medinipur district. Another sub-division, Egra has been created out of the erstwhile Contai sub-division during the partition of Medinipur. In 2011, the state government has proposed to rename the district as Tamralipta district after the ancient port city of Tamralipta which used to lie near the modern district headquarters.

Purba Medinipur saw many political movements during the British Raj. A parallel government named the Tamralipta Jatiya Sarkar was formed during the Quit India Movement in Tamluk. In 2007, Purba Medinipur witnessed the Nandigram violence, an incident of police firing that killed 14 farmers.

History

Tamralipta
Tamralipta, the port in ancient India, is believed by scholars to have been around modern-day Tamluk. It is mentioned in the writings of Ptolemy (150 AD), the Greco-Egyptian writer, as well as Faxian and Xuanzang, Chinese monks and travellers. It was the main port used by Ashoka, the Mauryan emperor. With too much siltation the port lost its importance around eighth century A.D.The supreme leader of Tamralipta Jatiya sarkar was Satish chandra Samanta.

Geography

Overview
Purba Medinipur district is part of the lower Indo-Gangetic Plain and Eastern coastal plains. Topographically, the district can be divided into two parts – (a) almost entirely flat plains on the west, east and north, (b) the coastal plains on the south. The vast expanse of land is formed of alluvium and is composed of younger and coastal alluvial. The elevation of the district is within 10 meters above the mean sea level. The district has a long coastline of 65.5  km along its southern and south eastern boundary. Five coastal CD Blocks, namely, Khejuri II, Contai II (Deshapran), Contai I, Ramnagar I and II, are occasionally affected by cyclones and tornadoes. Tidal floods are quite regular in these five CD Blocks. Normally floods occur in 21 of the 25 CD Blocks in the district. The major rivers are Haldi, Rupnarayan, Rasulpur, Bagui and Keleghai, flowing in north to south or south-east direction. River water is an important source of irrigation. The district has a low 899 hectare forest cover, which is 0.02% of its geographical area.

Major cities and towns
Major cities and towns include Panskura, Tamluk, Nandakumar, Contai, Egra, Haldia, Mecheda, Mahishadal, Digha, Mandarmani, Khejuri, Ramnagar, Patashpur, Kolaghat, Nandigram.

Divisions

Administrative subdivisions
Purba Medinipur district is divided into the following administrative subdivisions:

Tamluk subdivision consists of Tamluk municipality, Panskura municipality and seven community development blocks: Nandakumar, Moyna, Tamluk, Shahid Matangini, Panskura–I, Panskura–II and Chandipur (Nadigram–III). Haldia subdivision consists of Haldia municipality and five community development blocks: Mahishadal, Nandigram–I, Nandigram–II, Sutahata and Haldia. Egra subdivision consists of Egra municipality and five community development blocks: Bhagawanpur–I,Egra–I, Egra–II, Pataspur–I and Pataspur–II. Contai subdivision consists of Contai municipality and eight community development blocks: Kanthi–I, Kanthi–II, Kanthi–III, Khejuri–I, Khejuri–II, Ramnagar–I and Ramnagar–II, Bhagawanpur–II.

Tamluk is the district headquarters. There are 21 police stations, 25 development blocks, 5 municipalities and 223 gram panchayats in this district.

Other than in the municipality area, each subdivision contains community development blocks which in turn are divided into rural areas and census towns. In total there are 10 urban units: five municipalities and five census towns. Panskura municipality was established in 2001.

Tamluk subdivision
 Two municipalities: Tamluk and Panskura 
 Nandakumar community development block consists of rural areas only with 12 gram panchayats.
 Moyna community development block consists of rural areas with 11 gram panchayats and one census town: Garsafat.
 Tamluk community development block consists of rural areas with 12 gram panchayats and two census towns: Anantapur and Dakshin Baguan.
 Sahid Matangini community development block consists of rural areas with 10 gram panchayats and two census towns: Kakdihi and Shantipur.
 Panskura community development block consists of rural areas only with 14 gram panchayats.
 Kolaghat community development block consists of rural areas with 13 gram panchayats and four census towns: Kolaghat, Amalhara, Mihitikri and Kharisha.
 Chandipur community development block consists of rural areas with 10 gram panchayats and two census towns: Kotbar and Ershal.

Haldia subdivision
 One municipality: Haldia.
 Mahishadal community development block consists of rural areas with 11 gram panchayats and one census town: Garh Kamalpur.
 Nandigram I community development block consists of rural areas with 10 gram panchayats and one census town: Nandigram.
 Nandigram II community development block consists of rural areas with 7 gram panchayats and one census town: Ashadtalya.
 Sutahata community development block consists of rural areas with 6 gram panchayats and one census town: Barda
 Haldia community development block consists of rural areas only with 4 gram panchayats.

Egra subdivision
 One municipality: Egra.
 Bhagabanpur I community development block consists of rural areas with 10  gram panchayats and two census towns: Benudiya and Hincha Gerya. 
 Egra I community development block consists of rural areas only with 8  gram panchayats.
 Egra II community development block consists of rural areas only with 8  gram panchayats.
 Patashpur I community development block consists of rural areas only with 9  gram panchayats.
 Patashpur II community development block consists of rural areas only with 7  gram panchayats.

Contai subdivision
 One municipality: Contai.
 Contai I community development block consists of rural areas only with 8  gram panchayats.
 Deshapran community development block consists of rural areas with 8  gram panchayats and one census town: Basantia.
 Contai III community development block consists of rural areas only with 8  gram panchayats.
 Khejuri I community development block consists of rural areas only with 6  gram panchayats.
 Khejuri II community development block consists of rural areas only with 5  gram panchayats.
 Ramnagar I community development block consists of rural areas with 9  gram panchayats and one census town: Khadalgobra.
 Ramnagar II community development block consists of rural areas only with 8  gram panchayats.
 Bhagabanpur II community development block consists of rural areas only with 9 gram panchayats.

Assembly Constituencies 

Purba Medinipur contains 16 assembly constituencies, equally divided between two Lok Sabha constituencies Tamluk and Kanthi. The MP for Tamluk is Dibyendu Adhikari (AITC) while the MP for Kanthi is Sisir Adhikari (BJP). These are members of the Adhikari family which has dominated politics in the district whose prominent member has been Suvendu Adhikari, now Leader of Opposition in the West Bengal Legislative Assembly.

Demographics
According to the 2011 census Purba Medinipur district has a population of 5,095,875, roughly equal to the United Arab Emirates or the US state of Colorado. This gives it a ranking of 20th in India (out of a total of 640). Its population growth rate over the decade 2001-2011 was 15.32%. Purba Medinipur has a sex ratio of 936 females for every 1000 males, and a literacy rate of 88.60%. Scheduled Castes made up 14.63% of the district's population.

Bengali is the predominant language, spoken by 98.31% of the population. The dialect around Kanthi is heavily influenced by nearby dialect of Odia and along the Odisha border, the two languages cannot be distinguished

Religion 

Hindus are the majority religion in the district. Muslims are the second largest religion.

Economy
In 2006 the Ministry of Panchayati Raj named Purba Medinipur one of the country's 250 most backward districts (out of a total of 640). It is one of the 11 districts in West Bengal receiving funds from the Backward Regions Grant Fund Programme (BRGF).

Literacy and education
According to the 2011 census, the district has a literacy rate of 87.66 up from 80.20% of 2001 census. As per 2001 census, this district had a male literacy rate of 89.1% and female literacy rate was 70.7%. The education index of this district is 0.74 and it is ranked first in literacy in comparison to other districts of West Bengal.

Given in the table below (data in numbers) is a comprehensive picture of the education scenario in Purba Medinipur district for the year 2013–2014. It may be noted that primary schools include junior basic schools; middle schools, high schools, and higher secondary schools include madrasahs; technical schools include junior technical schools, junior government polytechnics, industrial technical institutes, industrial training centres, nursing training institutes, etc.; technical and professional colleges include engineering colleges, polytechnics, medical colleges, para-medical institutes, management colleges, teachers training, and nursing training colleges, law colleges, art colleges, music colleges etc. Special and non-formal education centres include sishu siksha kendras, madhyamik siksha kendras, centres of Rabindra mukta vidyalaya, recognised Sanskrit tols, institutions for the blind and other handicapped persons, Anganwadi centres, reformatory schools etc.

Healthcare
The table below (all data in numbers) presents an overview of the medical facilities available and patients treated in the hospitals, health centres and sub-centres in 2014 in Purba Medinipur district.

Tourism 
The coastal region of Purba Medinipur district is in the face of river Hoogly. With good coastal, landform, seasonal, rural and heritage diversity, it offers the potential for tourism in its typical coastlines and rural areas. The famous tourist spots are

Tamluk (Tamralipta) 

Tamluk, district headquarters of Purba Medinipur district is situated on the bank of river Rupnarayan which is a very popular picnic spot. The other places are:
 Temple of Devi Barghobhima is an 1150 years old Kali temple and is considered one of the 51 Shakti Peethas. According to Puran, the gorali of left feet of Sati/Parvati fell here when Lord Vishnu cut the sacred body of Goddess Sati into several pieces to make Lord Shiva quiet.
Archeological Museum of Tamluk is a must-see place. It contains artifacts of tamra (copper) and has preserved a tamralipta with Greek inscriptions. It preserves the historical heritage of Bengal.
Rakhit Bati is another important place to visit in Tamluk. At the beginning of the 19th century, it was famous as a secret centre of the then revolutionary parties Anusilan Samiti and Gupta Samiti.
 There are many other ancient temples in Tamluk town to visit, i.e., Jagannath Temple, Hari Temple, Mahaprabhu Temple, Ram Jiu Temple, Rajbari Temple, etc.

Panskura 

It is a municipality upgraded in 2002. It is one of the busiest towns in East Midnapore district. Panskura is known as "Valley of Flowers" with large supplies of flowers to other places. Panskura is also known for its green vegetables wholesale market near the Panskura Junction railway station. It is open every day after 10 pm until 7 am the next morning with a regular gathering of lakhs of people. Panskura is one of the busiest railway stations which extends up to Digha or Haldia directly through this station or by bus. The river Kansabati is a good picnic spot and Mahakali (Bhavatarini) temple nearby old Panskura bazar is a pilgrimage spot. Panskura is also well known for its cultural side. Many cultural schools and institutes are there. Panskura is famous for the recitation institute Chandabani [ছন্দবাণী].

Mahishadal 

Mahishadal is only 16  km from Tamluk town where tourists can visit the Mahishadal Rajbari, the museum there and Gopal Jiu temple. Geonkhali is a place 8  km from Mahishadal, a perfect picnic spot at the junction (mohona) of three rivers.

Digha 
Digha is a seaside resort town of Purba Medinipur district and, at the northern end of the Bay of Bengal, is the most popular seaside resort of West Bengal. Renowned for its beaches, Digha is visited by thousands of tourists every year.

Mandarmani 
Mandarmani is a small virgin beach on the Bay of Bengal under Kalindi Gram Panchayat, only 14  km from Digha-Contai Road from Chaulkhola Bus Stop. It is a small fishing harbour and a fast developing tourist spot.

Haldia 
It is being developed as a major trade port for Kolkata, intended mainly for bulk cargoes.

Notes

References

External links 

 
 Legacy of Midnapore (Medinipur, Midnapur, Purba Medinipur, Paschim Medinipur, East Midnapore, West Midnapore)
 
 Map of old Medinipur district (district has now been split)

 
Districts of West Bengal